Thomas Sturges Watson (born September 4, 1949) is an American retired professional golfer on the PGA Tour Champions, formerly on the PGA Tour.

In the 1970s and 1980s, Watson was one of the leading golf players in the world, winning eight major championships and heading the PGA Tour money list five times. He was the number one player in the world according to McCormack's World Golf Rankings from 1978 until 1982; in both 1983 and 1984, he was ranked second behind Seve Ballesteros. He also spent 32 weeks in the top 10 of the successor Sony Rankings in their debut in 1986.

Watson is also notable for his longevity: at nearly sixty years of age, and 26 years after his last major championship victory, he led after the second and third rounds of The Open Championship in 2009, but lost in a four-hole playoff. With a chance to win the tournament with par on the 72nd hole, he missed an  putt, then lost to Stewart Cink in the playoff.

Several of Watson's major victories came at the expense of Jack Nicklaus, the man he replaced as number one, most notably the 1977 Masters, 1977 Open Championship, and the 1982 U.S. Open. Though his rivalry with Nicklaus was intense, their friendly competitiveness served to increase golf's popularity at the time.

In Watson's illustrious career, his eight major championships include five Open Championships, two Masters titles, and one U.S. Open title. The only major that has eluded him is the PGA Championship; if he had won it would have put him in an elite group of golfing "career grand slam" winners that includes Gene Sarazen, Ben Hogan, Gary Player, Jack Nicklaus, and Tiger Woods. In all, Watson's eight majors ranks sixth on the list of total major championship victories, behind only Nicklaus, Woods, Walter Hagen, Hogan, and Player.

Watson is also regarded as one of the greatest links players of all time, a claim backed up by his five Open Championship victories, his runner-up finishes at the 1984 Open Championship and 2009 Open Championship, and his three Senior British Open Championship titles in his mid-50s (2003, 2005, and 2007).

Watson played on four Ryder Cup teams and captained the American side to victory in 1993 at The Belfry in England. More than twenty years later, Watson again captained the U.S. Team in 2014 in Scotland, this time in a loss.

Personal life
Born in Kansas City, Missouri, Watson was introduced to the game by his father Ray. His early coach was Stan Thirsk at the Kansas City Country Club. Watson first gained local renown while on his high school team at The Pembroke-Country Day School in Kansas City. Watson won four Missouri State Amateur championships, 1967, 1968, 1970, and 1971. He attended Stanford University, playing on the golf and table tennis teams, joining Alpha Sigma Phi, and graduating with a degree in psychology in 1971. Today he has a home in Overland Park, Kansas, after fighting a prominent legal battle to prevent annexation by the city.

Although he voted for George McGovern in his first presidential election, Watson later became a Republican. He has donated to the National Rifle Association.

Watson was a member of Kansas City Country Club from the beginning of his professional career. However, in 1990 he was unsettled by the idea that the leaders of the club rejected an applicant due to his Jewish faith. Watson, whose wife at the time and two children were Jewish, stated, "It was a very personal decision. I just didn't feel my family was welcome. It was time to say, 'Hey, let's be fair to people. Let's not judge people on the basis of race or faith.'" Watson abruptly resigned in 1990. However the Jewish applicant, H&R Block founder Henry W. Bloch, was ultimately admitted to the club as were other minorities. Disarmed by these overtures, Watson rejoined the club.

After residing for many years in Mission Hills, Kansas, Watson moved to Stilwell, Kansas with his second wife, two children, and three stepchildren. His house has since been annexed by the city of Overland Park. He designed the National Golf Club of Kansas City golf course.

PGA Tour

1970s
Watson joined the PGA Tour in 1971. He hired Bruce Edwards to be his caddie for the first time at the 1973 St. Louis tournament held at Norwood Hills Country Club, and the two connected, with Edwards caddying for Watson at most events after that for a period of many years.

Watson contended in a major championship for the first time at the U.S. Open in 1974 at Winged Foot, but he faded badly in the final round after having the 54-hole lead. Following this disappointment, Watson was approached in the locker room by legendary retired player Byron Nelson, a broadcaster at the event, who offered encouragement, insight and assistance. Nelson and Watson spoke briefly at that time, with Nelson saying he liked Watson's game and aggressiveness, and offered to help him improve. Watson, although disappointed by his weak finish, was flattered to receive Nelson's interest. However, the two men did not manage to get together to work on golf in depth until several months later, when Watson played in the Tour's Byron Nelson Classic in the Dallas area, and visited Nelson's nearby home. The two men would eventually develop a close and productive teacher-student relationship and friendship; Nelson had similarly mentored the young rising star Ken Venturi during the 1950s.

Only two weeks after the Winged Foot collapse in 1974, Watson won his first Tour title at the Western Open near Chicago, coming from six shots back in the final round at Butler National. With Nelson's guidance on swing mechanics and course management, and determined hard work, Watson's game advanced quickly, and he won his first major championship, the 1975 Open Championship, on his first appearance in the event in Britain. Watson holed a 20-foot putt for a birdie on the 72nd hole to tie Jack Newton. The following day Watson won an 18-hole playoff at Carnoustie by a stroke, carding a 71 to Newton's 72. Watson was able to gain the upper hand in the playoff after chipping in for an eagle at the 14th hole. Watson is one of only four players since World War II to have won the Open Championship on their debut, the others being Ben Hogan (1953), Tony Lema (1964) and Ben Curtis (2003).

Watson won his second major championship and his first green jacket as Masters champion in 1977 after a duel with Jack Nicklaus. During the final round, Watson stood on the 17th green tied with Nicklaus for the lead. Watson holed a 20-foot putt for a birdie to go one stroke ahead of Nicklaus. Watson's par on the 18th hole won him the Masters title by two strokes after Nicklaus had a bogey on the 18th.

Watson's 1977 Open Championship victory, at Turnberry in Scotland, was especially memorable, and is considered by many to be the finest tournament played in the second half of the 20th century. After two rounds, he and Jack Nicklaus were one shot out of the lead and paired for the third round. Both shot 65, ending the third round three shots clear of the field. Watson and Nicklaus were again paired for the final round. On the last day, the two were tied after 16 holes. Nicklaus missed a makeable birdie putt on 17, losing his share of the lead to Watson, who birdied 17. On the 18th, Nicklaus drove into the rough, while Watson drove the fairway. Watson's approach landed two feet from the flag, while Nicklaus, after a drive into deep rough and near a gorse plant, managed to get his approach 40 feet away. Nicklaus sank his birdie putt to finish with a 66, but Watson followed suit with his own birdie, finishing with a second straight 65 and his second Open, with a record score of 268 (12 under par). The two players finished well ahead of the other challengers (Hubert Green in third place was ten strokes behind Nicklaus, at 279), and shot the same score every round except for the final day, which was then played on Saturday.

In 1978, as defending Masters champion, Watson needed a par on the 18th hole of his final round to tie over 72 holes with Gary Player, who had shot a record-tying final round of 64. However, Watson missed out on a playoff by sending his approach shot to the 18th into the gallery and missing the 10-foot par putt he needed for a playoff. He finished tied for 2nd place at Augusta, one stroke behind Gary Player. Watson had five PGA Tour victories in 1978, but he also had one of the biggest disappointments of his career in that year's PGA Championship in August at Oakmont. Watson had a five-shot lead after 54 holes, but lost the tournament in a 3-way sudden-death playoff to John Mahaffey. This would be the closest that Watson came to landing the one major title that eluded him.

In 1979, Watson had a further five PGA Tour victories, including a five-shot victory in the Sea Pines Heritage Classic, which he won with a then tournament record 14-under par 270. Watson again finished runner-up at the Masters in 1979, when he lost in a 3-way sudden-death playoff to Fuzzy Zoeller. This was the first sudden-death playoff at the Masters, with the previous playoff at Augusta in 1970 having taken place on Monday under an 18-hole format. Watson also finished 2nd in The Players Championship in 1979.

1980s
Watson had an outstanding year in 1980. A brilliant third round of 64 at Muirfield helped him to win his third Open Championship title in Britain by four strokes. He was the leading money winner on the PGA Tour for the fourth consecutive year, winning six tournaments in America. Watson showed tremendous consistency in 1980, with sixteen top-10 finishes on the PGA Tour that year. In August 1980, after his sixth victory of the year in America, Watson said: "I love this game. I feel that dedication is the only way to improve. I've been more consistent this year than in the previous three years."

In 1981, Watson won his second Masters title at Augusta by two strokes over Jack Nicklaus and Johnny Miller. Watson had a further two Tour victories in 1981 at the USF&G New Orleans Open and the Atlanta Classic.

The U.S. Open was the major that Watson most wanted to win. In 1982 at Pebble Beach, he was able to realize his dream after an engaging duel with Jack Nicklaus in one of the most memorable major championships of all time. Playing three groups ahead of Watson in the final round, Nicklaus charged into a share of the lead with five consecutive birdies. When Watson reached the par-3 17th hole the two were still tied, but with Nicklaus safely in the clubhouse at 4-under par 284. Watson hit his tee shot on the 17th into the rough just off the green, leaving an extremely difficult chip shot downhill on a very fast green. While being interviewed on national television and fully aware of Watson's perilous predicament, Nicklaus appeared confident he was on his way to an unprecedented fifth U.S. Open championship. Watson's chip shot, amazingly, hit the flag stick and fell into the cup, giving him a miraculous birdie and setting the stage for yet another win over Nicklaus. Watson went on to birdie the 18th as well, for a final margin of two shots.

The following month in July 1982 at Royal Troon in Scotland, Watson became only the third golfer since World War II to win the U.S. Open and Open Championship in the same year after Ben Hogan (1953) and Lee Trevino (1971) - a feat later matched by Tiger Woods (2000). After the first two rounds of the 1982 Open Championship, Watson was seven shots behind the leader Bobby Clampett, whose commanding lead was reduced after a third round of 78. During the final round, Nick Price, who was playing in one of the groups behind Watson, gained the lead. Watson stood on the 18th tee of the final round two strokes behind Price. Watson waited patiently after his round as Price's lead evaporated, leaving Watson the Open winner by one stroke.

In 1983, as defending U.S. Open champion at Oakmont, Watson shared the 54-hole lead with Seve Ballesteros. In the final round though, Watson missed a 6-foot putt for par on the 17th and finished in 2nd place, one stroke behind the winner Larry Nelson. The following month in July 1983, Watson won his fifth Open Championship and the last of his eight majors at Royal Birkdale, his only Open victory on English soil. (His four other titles came in Scotland.)

In 1984, Watson finished runner-up for the third time at the Masters, finishing two strokes behind the champion Ben Crenshaw. Watson had three Tour wins in 1984, including his third victory in the Western Open after a playoff against Greg Norman. A fortnight later in the 1984 Open Championship at St Andrews, Watson was in contention during the final holes to win a third consecutive Open and a sixth Open Championship overall to tie the record for the most Open wins by Harry Vardon. However, Watson bogeyed the par-4 "Road Hole" 17th and Seve Ballesteros birdied the 18th, resulting in a victory for Ballesteros and Watson finishing in a tie for 2nd place.

After his runner-up finish in the 1984 British Open, Watson did not manage to win a PGA Tour event for the next three years until the 1987 Nabisco Championship. Watson went from being the PGA Tour money leader in 1984 to finishing 18th on the PGA Tour's money list in 1985. As a result of a decline in form, Watson missed out on a place in the 1985 U.S. Ryder Cup team.

In the 1986 Hawaiian Open, Watson was the third-round leader and was aiming to end his winless streak since July 1984. However, Watson bogeyed the 71st and 72nd holes and finished in a tie for 3rd place, behind the winner Corey Pavin.

In the 1987 U.S. Open, Watson had a one-shot lead going into the final round at the Olympic Club. Watson was a gallery favorite during the tournament. He had strong support from the spectators having played golf for Stanford University, 30 miles south of the Olympic Club in San Francisco. He was aiming to win his ninth major championship, which would have tied him for major wins with Ben Hogan and Gary Player, but Watson lost the tournament by a stroke to Scott Simpson. In the final round, Simpson had three consecutive birdies on the back-nine to take the lead. Watson's 45-foot putt for a birdie on the 72nd hole which would have forced a playoff with Simpson was about two inches short.

Watson's stellar play on the PGA Tour faded in the late 1980s when he began to have problems putting even though his tee-to-green game seemed to improve. During this period he had some near-misses in tournaments. Watson finished 2nd at the 1988 NEC World Series of Golf, missing a 3-foot putt in a playoff against Mike Reid.

In 1989, Watson was in contention during the Open Championship at Royal Troon, but he finished in 4th place, two strokes outside the playoff between Mark Calcavecchia, Wayne Grady and Greg Norman.

1990–2019
At the 1991 Masters Tournament, Watson stood on the 18th tee in the final round at Augusta with a share of the lead but had a double-bogey 6 to finish in a tie for 3rd place, two strokes behind the champion Ian Woosnam. It was Watson's 15th consecutive top-20 finish at The Masters, having finished in the top-10 of The Masters in 13 of the 15 years between 1977 and 1991.

In 1994, when The Open Championship returned to Turnberry, the site of his 1977 victory, Watson commented, "Sometimes you lose your desire through the years. Any golfer goes through that. When you play golf for a living, like anything in your life, you are never going to be constantly, at the top". He finished tied for 11th at the Open Championship that year, but he had a revival in the late 1990s, winning the 1996 Memorial Tournament and gaining the last of his 39 wins on the PGA Tour at the 1998 MasterCard Colonial when he was 48 years old.

In 1997 Watson won the Japan Golf Tour's prestigious Dunlop Phoenix tournament for the second time. It was the last of his four victories in Japan.

In the 2003 U.S. Open, at age 53, he shared the opening-round lead by shooting a 65 with his long-time caddy Bruce Edwards carrying his clubs and giving advice. Edwards had been diagnosed with Lou Gehrig's disease earlier in the year, and Watson contributed significant time and money that year with Bruce to raise money for research into finding a cure for motor neuron disease. Edwards died on April 8, 2004.

Watson was one of two players to play with Jack Nicklaus in the final two rounds of golf in Nicklaus' career, which ended at the 2005 Open Championship on the Old Course at St Andrews. Englishman Luke Donald was the third member of the group.

In the first round of the 2009 Open Championship at Turnberry, Watson shot a 5-under 65, one stroke behind the leader Miguel Ángel Jiménez. In the second round, he tied for the lead after making a huge putt on the 18th green. His score for the round was 70, 38 out and 32 back. This made Watson – at 59 years of age – the oldest man to have the lead after any round of a major. In addition, with a relatively low-scoring third round, one-over-par 71, he kept the lead outright by one shot, so also became the oldest player to lead a major going into the last round. He acknowledged after that 3rd round he was thinking of Bruce Edwards as he walked the 18th fairway.

Watson finished regulation 72-hole play in the Open tied for the lead with Stewart Cink, with a cumulative score of −2. He needed a par on the 72nd hole to capture a sixth career Open Championship title, but his second shot on the 72nd hole went over the green. Then, from several yards behind the 18th green, Watson first putted up the slope and past the hole, then missed a second 8-foot putt by about 6 inches to the right of the cup. His bogey led to a four-hole aggregate playoff with Cink, running through the 5th, 6th, 17th, and 18th holes. With several errant shots not typical of the previous 72 holes, he lost the playoff by six strokes.

The following April, Watson competed in the 2010 Masters Tournament. Watson shot an opening-round 67, one shot off the first-round lead held by fellow Champions Tour player Fred Couples. Watson subsequently posted rounds of 74, 73, and 73. His 72-hole, one-under-par total of 287 gave Watson a share of eighteenth place. Watson thus became only the second player in history, after Sam Snead, to post a top-20 finish in at least one major championship in five different decades. Watson holds the  record for the longest time span between first and last playoffs on the PGA Tour. That time span is 34 years, 6 days. Watson won the 1975 Open Championship in an 18-hole playoff and 34 years later lost a playoff for the 2009 Open Championship.

Due to his performance in 2009 and early 2010, along with his 1982 U.S. Open victory at Pebble Beach, the USGA awarded Watson a special exemption to the 2010 U.S. Open. He finished the tournament tied for 29th.

In an interview in 2012, Watson admitted that he was "distraught" at coming so close to becoming the oldest Major winner at the age of 59 and said that the experience in the 2009 Open Championship "tore his guts out". Watson said of his approach shot to the green at the 72nd hole, when he needed a par to win the Open: "I was going right at the flag but with the uncertainty of links golf, maybe a gust of wind took it a bit further than it was supposed to. I felt extreme disappointment that night but the one good thing that came of that was the response of people around the world."

For the 2015 Open Championship, Watson's exemption for his 2009 finish was extended to give him an opportunity to play at St. Andrews and make one final Open appearance. Watson won Open Championships at five different courses, but St. Andrews was not among them. He missed the cut and made an emotional walk across the Swilcan Bridge at twilight. In April 2016, he played in his final Masters. After saying in the lead up to the event that he 'couldn't compete' anymore, Watson missed the cut by two strokes.

Despite no longer competing at the full Masters, Watson won the 2018 Masters Tournament Par-3 contest at the age of 68, the oldest ever to win the event.

In July 2019, Watson played his final competitive event on British soil, when he played in the Senior British Open for the final time.

Streaks
Watson is the only golfer to score a round of 67 or less in all 4 majors at least once in 5 different decades. His best round in the Masters is a 67. His first 67 came in 1977. Other 67s were scored in the 1980s, 1990s and 2010s. His most recent 67 at Augusta was his opening round in 2010. His US Open low score is a 65. He scored 65 in 1987 and 2003, 66 in 1993 and he first shot 67 in 1975. At the British Open, Watson's low score is a 64 in 1980. 65s were scored in 1977 (twice), 1994 and 2009 (all 65s at the Open were scored at Turnberry). Finally, at the PGA Championship, Watson's low score of the 1970s was a 66 in 1979. In the 1980s he scored a 67 in 1980, 1983, 1985, and 1989. His low PGA score is a 65 in 1993 & 2000.

Watson also sets a record for having a round of 65 or less in at least one of the majors in 4 different decades. 1970s: 1977 British Open (65 in rounds 3 and 4), 1980s: 1980 British Open (64 in round 3), 1990s: 1993 PGA Championship (65 in round 2), and 2000s: 2000 PGA Championship (65 in round 3).

Watson's 67 in the first round at the 2010 Masters also gives him a record to be the only person to have at least one round of 67 or less in any of the four majors in five different decades (1970s, 1980s, 1990s, 2000s, and 2010s).

Champions Tour
Watson joined the Champions Tour in 1999, the same year he earned an honorary membership of the Royal and Ancient Golf Club of St Andrews in Scotland. He has 14 wins on the Champions Tour, including six senior majors, while playing a limited schedule of events. Watson shares with Gary Player and Bernhard Langer three victories for each in the Senior Open Championship. Watson revisited his 1977 Open Championship win at Turnberry with another win there in the 2003 Senior Open Championship. He followed this up with victories in 2005 and 2007.

Playing style

Watson has been one of the most complete players ever to play golf, as evidenced by his competitiveness in the 2009 Open Championship at the age of 59. Standing 5 ft 9 in and weighing 160 pounds during his PGA Tour years, he achieved abundant length with accuracy, played aggressively, developed a superlative short game, and in his prime was a very skilled and confident putter. Watson is renowned as an exceptional bad-weather golfer, having displayed this gritty talent best in the difficult and varied conditions of The Open Championship. At the height of his career, he was well known for his excellent recovery skills, especially around the greens. Years later, if a player escaped from trouble and somehow made par, tour players described the escape as a "Watson par".

Watson also developed a reputation for scrupulous honesty, once even calling a penalty stroke on himself for slightly moving a ball that was in deep rough, although no one else had seen it. In 1991, Watson was critical of the heckling of his playing partner Ian Woosnam during the final round of the Masters. Some of the Augusta crowd were vociferous in their support for Watson, in the hope of seeing him win a third Masters title. Watson, however, calmed Woosnam after he was upset at being yelled at by a member of the crowd on the 14th tee. Watson later said: "There's been a breakdown in decorum, and I don't feel good when partisanship spills over."

In 2010, Watson said that he agreed with Lee Westwood's assertion that Tour players who used 20-year-old Ping-Eye 2 wedges to get around new rules prohibiting box grooves (i.e., grooves rectangular [including square] or U-shaped in cross-section) were going against "the spirit of the game." Watson also reprimanded Tiger Woods for his "language and club-throwing" and said that Woods needed to "show humility" to the public.

Watson has been outspoken about the effect that too much prize money can have on some golfers. In an interview in 2010, Watson said: "I do believe that, in certain instances, players can be corrupted by the amount of money they make. I think too much money corrupts the desire and for some players it's about how much money they make rather than just trying to be the best player they can."

Distinctions and honors
 Named PGA Player of the Year 6 times, 1977, 1978, 1979, 1980, 1982 and 1984, and trails only Tiger Woods, who has been named Player of the Year 11 times.
 Won the Vardon Trophy for lowest scoring average three straight years: 1977, 1978, and 1979.
 Played on four Ryder Cup teams: 1977, 1981, 1983, and 1989 and captained the victorious 1993 team along with the 2014 team. Watson also qualified for the 1979 matches but withdrew from the United States team due to his wife being about to give birth. He was replaced by Mark Hayes. 
 Voted the Bob Jones Award in 1987, the highest honor given by the United States Golf Association in recognition of distinguished sportsmanship in golf.
 Inducted into the World Golf Hall of Fame in 1988.
 Inducted into the Stanford Athletic Hall of Fame
 Won 1992 GCSAA Old Tom Morris Award
 Resigned from the Kansas City Country Club in 1991 in protest to its exclusion of people of Jewish ethnicity. He subsequently rejoined after the club's acceptance of Jewish and minority members.
 Became involved with golf course design in the early 1990s.
 Author or co-authored several books, including Tom Watson's Strategic Golf. His latest, The Timeless Swing, was released by Atria books in March 2011.
 Has written a golf instruction column in Golf Digest magazine since the mid-1970s.
 Was ranked as the 10th greatest golfer of all time in the 2000 Golf Digest magazine list.
 Is, after Sam Snead, only the second Golf Professional Emeritus at The Greenbrier Resort in White Sulphur Springs, West Virginia
 Is the oldest player to hold the lead after 54 holes at a major championship (2009 Open Championship at Turnberry, Scotland)
 Is the oldest player to lead after any completed round at a major championship (2009 Open Championship at Turnberry, Scotland)
 Is the oldest player to shoot under par at the Masters Tournament (2015 Masters Tournament)
 Granted a lifetime membership to the European Tour
 At 68, became the oldest player ever to win the Masters Tournament Par-3 contest
 Named as an Honorary Starter for the Masters Tournament in 2022, becoming the 11th honorary starter in Masters history.

Professional wins (70)

PGA Tour wins (39)

PGA Tour playoff record (9–5)

European Tour wins (8)

European Tour playoff record (1–3)

Japan Golf Tour wins (4)

Japan Golf Tour playoff record (0–1)

PGA Tour of Australasia wins (1)

Asia Golf Circuit wins (1)

Other wins (2)

Champions Tour wins (14)

Champions Tour playoff record (3–8)

Other senior wins (9)
 1999 Diners Club Matches (with Jack Nicklaus)
 2000 Hyundai Team Matches (with Jack Nicklaus)
 2004 Wendy's Champions Skins Game
 2005 Liberty Mutual Legends of Golf – Raphael Division (with Andy North)
 2006 Liberty Mutual Legends of Golf – Raphael Division (with Andy North)
 2007 Wendy's Champions Skins Game (with Jack Nicklaus), Liberty Mutual Legends of Golf – Raphael Division (with Andy North)
 2010 Wendy's Champions Skins Game (with Jack Nicklaus)
 2011 Wendy's Champions Skins Game (with Jack Nicklaus)

Major championships

Wins (8)

1Defeated Newton in 18-hole playoff; Watson (71), Newton (72)

Results timeline

CUT = missed the halfway cut (3rd round cut in 1976 Open Championship)
"T" indicates a tie for a place.

Summary

 Most consecutive cuts made – 19 (1985 Open Championship – 1990 Masters)
 Longest streak of top-10s – 7 (1982 Masters – 1983 Open Championship)

Results in The Players Championship

CUT = missed the halfway cut
"T" indicates a tie for a place

Results in World Golf Championships

QF, R16, R32, R64 = Round in which player lost in match play

Senior major championships

Wins (6)

1Defeated Mason in a playoff with par at the second extra hole.
2Defeated Smyth in a playoff with par at the third extra hole.
3Defeated Eger in a playoff with birdie at the first extra hole.

Results timeline
Results not in chronological order before 2017.

Note: The Senior British Open was not a Champions Tour major until 2003.

CUT = missed the halfway cut
"T" indicates a tie for a place

U.S. national team appearances

Professional
 Ryder Cup: 1977 (winners), 1981 (winners), 1983 (winners), 1989 (tie), 1993 (non-playing captain, winners), 2014 (non-playing captain)
 Wendy's 3-Tour Challenge (representing Senior PGA Tour): 1999 (winners), 2000, 2001

Golf courses designed

Watson is a member of the American Society of Golf Course Architects and has designed golf courses through his Tom Watson Design company in Johnson County, Kansas.
 Ballybunion Golf Club – County Kerry, Ireland (1995 redesign)
 Cassique Golf Course, Kiawah Island, South Carolina
 National Golf Club of Kansas City, Parkville, Missouri (Route 45 which passes the course is called the "Tom Watson Parkway")
 Independence Course at Reunion Resort & Club, Orlando, Florida
 Phoenix Resort, Miyazaki, Japan
 The Links at Spanish Bay, Pebble Beach, California (with Sandy Tatum and Robert Trent Jones, Jr.)
 Shadow Glen the Golf Club, Olathe, Kansas (with Jay Morrish and Tom Weiskopf)
 Loch Lloyd Country Club, Village of Loch Lloyd, Missouri (Renovation)
 The Conservatory, Hammock Beach resorts, Palm Coast, Florida
 Mozingo Lake Golf Course (Junior 9 course), Maryville, Missouri
 The Manor Golf & Country Club, Milton, Georgia

See also

 1971 PGA Tour Qualifying School graduates
 List of golfers with most PGA Tour wins
 List of men's major championships winning golfers
 List of golfers with most Champions Tour wins
 List of golfers with most Champions Tour major championship wins
 List of golfers with most wins in one PGA Tour event
 Bay Area Sports Hall of Fame

References

External links

 
 
 
 
 
 
 American Society of Golf Course Architects profile

American male golfers
Stanford Cardinal men's golfers
PGA Tour golfers
PGA Tour Champions golfers
Ryder Cup competitors for the United States
Winners of men's major golf championships
Winners of senior major golf championships
World Golf Hall of Fame inductees
Golf writers and broadcasters
Golfers from Missouri
The Greenbrier people
Sportspeople from Kansas City, Missouri
People from Mission Hills, Kansas
People from Stilwell, Kansas
1949 births
Living people